John Stockton (December 24, 1798 – November 21, 1878) was an American soldier, pioneer, and territorial legislator.

Born in Lancaster, Pennsylvania, he moved with his family to a farm in Chillicothe, Ohio. During the War of 1812, Stockton served in the United States Army. In 1815, Stockton served as private secretary to Lewis Cass, Governor of Michigan Territory. In 1817, Stockton settled in Mount Clemens, Michigan. Stockton served as clerk, register, and justice of the peace of Macomb County, Michigan. Stockton served in the Michigan Territorial Council from 1824 to 1831 and then 1834 to 1835. He was a Democrat. Stockton also served as postmaster of Mount Clemens, Michigan. Stockton served as an officer of the 8th Michigan Volunteer Cavalry Regiment during the American Civil War. Stockton died in Mount Clemens, Michigan.

References

1798 births
1878 deaths
Politicians from Lancaster, Pennsylvania
Politicians from Chillicothe, Ohio
People from Mount Clemens, Michigan
United States Army personnel of the War of 1812
People of Michigan in the American Civil War
Michigan Democrats
Members of the Michigan Territorial Legislature
Michigan postmasters
19th-century American politicians